Attila Plókai (born 17 July 1969) is a Hungarian former football player. In the Hungarian championship, he was particularly feared for his free-kicks.

Honours
Hungarian League:  Winner: 1993 
Hungarian Cup:  Winner: 1996

References 

1969 births
Living people
Hungarian footballers
Hungarian expatriate footballers
Nemzeti Bajnokság I players
Veikkausliiga players
Debreceni VSC players
Budapest Honvéd FC players
Lombard-Pápa TFC footballers
Vasas SC players
Expatriate footballers in Finland
Association football defenders
Hungary international footballers